Manoj Sabharwal (born 6 March 1985) is an Indian scriptwriter, He is one of the highest paid and witty script writer of Indian television industry for non-fiction shows, in these days he is producing so many web series for ott platform and tv also, he has own a production house named ‘creative mafia productions’  creative mafia producing many tv shows and ott shows.

Early life and education
Sabharwal born in Jalandhar, Punjab and he completed his school in Jalandhar, Punjab.

Throughout his academic life he has been an active participant in theatre and other curricular activities. He attended Apeejay college of Fine Arts, Jalandhar (G.N.D.U).

Career
Sabharwal started his career from DD Punjabi, as a writer for a show called 'Hasda Punjab'. Later he joined DAV College, Jalandhar as a professional skit director. He moved to Mumbai in December 2010 and joined as an assistant writer at Optimystix Media Private Limited, producers of comedy circus and TV shows.

Filmography

Film

Television

Web

References

External links
 

1985 births
Living people
Indian male comedians
Indian television writers
People from Jalandhar district
Male actors from Punjab, India
Screenwriters from Punjab, India
Indian male film actors
Male television writers